Events during the year 2005 in Poland.

Incumbents

Events 

 9 and 23 October – 2005 Polish presidential election

Deaths 

 11 January – Jerzy Pawłowski, fencer and double agent (born 1932).
 20 January – Jan Nowak-Jeziorański, journalist, writer, politician and social worker (born 1914)
 25 January – Stanisław Albinowski, economist (born 1923)
 21 February – Zdzisław Beksiński painter, photographer and sculptor (born 1929)
 17 March – Czesław Słania, engraver (born 1921)
 3 April – Aleksy Antkiewicz, boxer (born 1923).
 17 April – Marian Sawa, composer (born 1937)
 12 May – Zdzisław Gierwatowski, footballer (born 1920)
 14 May – Józef Gąsienica, Nordic combined skier (born 1941).
 26 May – Krzysztof Nowak, footballer (born 1975)
 30 May – Tomasz Pacyński, fantasy and science fiction writer (born 1958)
 26 June – Filip Adwent, politician (born 1955)
 20 August – Romuald Grabczewski, chess player (born 1932)
 31 August – Joseph Rotblat, physicist (born 1908)
 16 September – Arkadiusz Gołaś, volleyball player (born 1981).
 24 September – Daniel Podrzycki, politician (born 1963)
 13 October – Marian Zieliński, weightlifter (born 1929).
 17 November – Marek Perepeczko, actor (born 1942)

References 

 
Years of the 21st century in Poland
Poland